Mill Farm Inn is a historic country inn located near Tryon, Polk County, North Carolina.  The inn was built between 1937 and 1939, and is a two-story, six bay by four bay, Colonial Revival style stone building. It is constructed of local blue granite.

It was added to the National Register of Historic Places in 2009.

References

Hotel buildings on the National Register of Historic Places in North Carolina
Colonial Revival architecture in North Carolina
Hotel buildings completed in 1939
Buildings and structures in Polk County, North Carolina
National Register of Historic Places in Polk County, North Carolina